Quebec Dynamo ARSQ was a Canadian soccer club, founded in 2008 in the province of Québec. The women’s team is a member of the United Soccer Leagues W-League, the second tier of women’s soccer in the United States and Canada. The team debuted in the Great Lakes Division of the Central Conference against teams from Hamilton, Laval, London, Ottawa,  Rochester and Toronto.

The team's colours are black and white. Quebec Dynamo ARSQ play the home games at the Collège François-Xavier-Garneau stadium in Quebec City.

History
Quebec Dynamo ARSQ was founded in 2008 by four promoters: Samir Ghrib, David Desloges, Stéphane Alain and Maxime Barabé. The presentation of team's colors shirts and the nomination of a general manager takes place on September 24, 2009. The new team is consist a non-profit organization from the Association Régionale de Soccer de Québec  (ARSQ). The team created to ensure the development of regional soccer in the Quebec city and Chaudière-Appalaches region.

Name change
The original name for the franchise was the Arsenal SC, however, lawyers representing the English club Arsenal F.C. demanded that the team change its name, because they hold exclusive rights for that trademark in Canada.  Starting with the 2014 W-League season, the team name was changed from Quebec City Amiral SC to Quebec Dynamo ARSQ. The league ended following the 2015 season, however, the club re-formed in 2018 to play in the Première Ligue de soccer du Québec.

Rivalries
Quebec Dynamo ARSQ have a big rivalry with the Laval Comets. Several former players of Comets play now for the Dynamo. In matches between the two teams, it is not uncommon for supporters to travel Quebec city-Montreal or Montreal-Quebec city to go to encourage their teams.

Year-by-year

Players

Squad 2011

Staff 2013
    Owner:  Denis Poulin
    General Manager:  Jean-Pascal Ladroue
    Operations director:  Jean-Philippe Provost
    Head Coach: Samir Ghrib
    Assistant Coach: Guillaume Couillard
    Assistant Coach (Goalkeepers): 
    Equipment manager:  Jean-Guy Roy
    Team Physician:  Dr. Sylvain Boutet
    Team Physician:  Dr. Sylvain Lachance
    Physical therapist:  Maxime Sanou
    Physiotherapist: Andrée-Anne Ferron
    Physiotherapist: Patrice Pépin
    Student-Physiotherapist:  Laurie Thiboutot

Former head coach 
  Fabien Cottin, (2009) 
  Jonas Worth, (2010)

Former assistant coach 
   Christophe Blin, (2012)
   Marie-Ève Laflamme, (2009)
   Eduardo Guerra, (2010)

External links
 (French)  Amiral SC website
  Amiral SC on USL Soccer

References

Women's soccer clubs in Canada
Sports teams in Quebec City
Soccer clubs in Quebec
United Soccer League teams based in Canada
USL W-League (1995–2015) teams
2008 establishments in Quebec
Association football clubs established in 2008